This is a list of fossiliferous stratigraphic units in Northern Cyprus.

References

 

Northern Cyprus-related lists
List
 Northern Cyprus
 Northern Cyprus